Eliakim Uasi is a Tongan rugby league footballer who played for Tonga as a  at the 2008 World Cup.

Background
Uasi was born in Tonga.

Playing career
A Mangere East Hawks junior, Uasi has previously played for the Counties Manukau Jetz and Harbour League in the  Bartercard Cup competition. He has also played for the Mt Albert Lions in the Auckland Rugby League competition and has represented the Auckland Vulcans in the NSW Cup.

Uasi has also appeared on several occasions for the Tonga national rugby league team, playing in the 2006 Federation Shield and 2008 Rugby League World Cup.

He played for the Souths Logan Magpies in the 2011 Queensland Cup. Since 2012 he has played for the Papakura Sea Eagles.

In 2015, while playing for the Papakura Sea Eagles, he played for both Auckland and Counties Manukau.

References

1980 births
Living people
Tongan rugby league players
Tonga national rugby league team players
Mount Albert Lions players
Mangere East Hawks players
Auckland rugby league team players
New Zealand rugby league players
North Harbour rugby league team players
Souths Logan Magpies players
Papakura Sea Eagles players
Rugby league hookers
Counties Manukau rugby league team players